The 2017 IIHF Inline Hockey World Championship Division I was an international inline hockey tournament run by the International Ice Hockey Federation. The Division I tournament ran alongside the 2017 IIHF Inline Hockey World Championship tournament and took place between 25 June and 1 July 2017 in Bratislava, Slovakia at the Ondrej Nepela Arena Rink 2 and Ondrej Nepela Arena. The tournament was won by Slovenia who upon winning gained promotion to the 2019 IIHF Inline Hockey World Championship. While New Zealand and Brazil were relegated to the Qualifications after losing their placement round games along with Hungary who lost the relegation game against Argentina.

Qualification
Thirteen teams attempted to qualify for the three remaining spots in the 2017 IIHF Inline Hockey World Championship Division I tournament. The other five nations automatically qualified based on their results from the 2015 Championship and 2015 Division I tournament. Two qualification tournaments were held with a place awarded to the winner of each tournament. The Asia/Oceania Qualification tournament was contested between Chinese Taipei, India, Japan and New Zealand with New Zealand winning promotion and returning to Division I after being relegated in 2012. Malaysia and Singapore were initially announced to be competing in the tournament however later withdrew and were replaced by Chinese Taipei. The Europe Qualification tournament was contested between Austria, Belgium, Bulgaria, Israel, Latvia, Macedonia, Serbia and Turkey with Latvia winning promotion and returning to Division I after being relegated in 2015. Ireland was initially announced to be competed in the tournament however later withdrew. A third qualification tournament representing the regions of the Americas and Africa was originally planned however Brazil was the only registered participant and so gained automatic qualification to Division I.

 − Finished fourth in 2015 World Championship Division I
 − Finished second in 2015 World Championship Division I
 − Americas/Africa qualifier
 − Finished third in 2015 World Championship Division I
 − Finished fifth in 2015 World Championship Division I
 − Winner of the Europe Qualification tournament
 − Winner of the Asia/Oceania Qualification tournament
 − Relegated from the 2015 World Championship

Asia/Oceania Qualification
The 2016 IIHF Inline Hockey Qualification Asia/Oceania was held in New Plymouth, New Zealand from 21 to 23 April 2016. New Zealand gained promotion to Division I after winning their three games and finishing first in the standings. Japan finished in second place and Chinese Taipei in third.

All times are local.

Europe Qualification
The 2016 IIHF Inline Hockey Qualification Europe was held in Steindorf, Austria from 22 to 25 June 2016. Latvia gained promotion after defeating Austria 4–2 in the final. Israel finished third place after defeating Macedonia in the 10–5 in the third place match.

Preliminary round

Group A

Group B

Placement round
7th/8th game

5th/6th game

3rd/4th game

1st/2nd game

Seeding and groups
The seeding in the preliminary round was based on the final standings at the 2015 IIHF Inline Hockey World Championship and 2015 IIHF Inline Hockey World Championship Division I, and the qualification tournaments. Division I's groups are named Group C and Group D while the 2017 IIHF Inline Hockey World Championship use Group A and Group B, as both tournaments are held in Bratislava, Slovakia. The teams were grouped accordingly by seeding at the previous year's tournament (in parenthesis is the corresponding seeding):

Group C
 (9)
 (12)
 (13)
 (16)

Group D
 (10)
 (11)
 (14)
 (15)

Preliminary round
Eight participating teams were placed in the following two groups. After playing a round-robin, every team advanced to the Playoff round.

All times are local (UTC+3).

Group C

Group D

Playoff round
All eight teams advanced into the playoff round and were seeded into the quarterfinals according to their result in the preliminary round. The winning quarter finalists advanced through to the semifinals, while the losing teams moved through to the classification round. New Zealand and Brazil were relegated to the Qualifications after losing their classification round games and finished the tournament in seventh and eighth respectively. After winning their classification games Hungary and Argentina competed in the relegation game with Hungary being relegated to the Qualifications after losing 4–5 after a shootout. In the semifinals Slovenia defeated Great Britain and Latvia beat Australia, both advancing to the gold medal game. After losing the semifinals Great Britain and Australia played off for the bronze medal with Australia winning 7–3. Slovenia defeated Latvia 6–3 in the gold medal game and earned promotion to the 2019 IIHF Inline Hockey World Championship.

All times are local (UTC+2).

Quarterfinals

Classification

Semifinals

Relegation game

Bronze medal game

Gold medal game

Ranking and statistics

Final standings
The final standings of the tournament according to IIHF:

Tournament Awards
Best players selected by the directorate:
Best Goalkeeper:  David Duschek
Best Defenseman:  Luis Custodio
Best Forward:  Owen Haiek

Scoring leaders

List shows the top skaters sorted by points, then goals. If the list exceeds 10 skaters because of a tie in points, all of the tied skaters are shown.

Leading goaltenders
Only the top five goaltenders, based on save percentage, who have played at least 40% of their team's minutes are included in this list.

References

External links
Division I at IIHF.com

IIHF Inline Hockey World Championship Division I
2017 in inline hockey
IIHF InLine Hockey World Championship
IIHF Inline Hockey World Championship Division I
Sports competitions in Bratislava
June 2017 sports events in Europe
July 2017 sports events in Europe
Inline hockey in Slovakia